Complementors are businesses that directly sell a product (or products) or service (or services) that complement the product or service of another company by adding value to mutual customers; for example, Intel and Microsoft (Pentium processors and Windows), or Microsoft and McAfee (Microsoft Windows & McAfee anti-virus).

Complementors are sometimes called "The Sixth Force" (from Porter's Five Forces model), a term which was coined by Adam Brandenburger.

See also
 Porter's five forces analysis

References
 Brandenburger and Nalebuff, Architecture Wins, 1998
 Brandenburger and Nalebuff, The Value Chain, 1998
 Nalebuff and Brandenburger, Co-opetition, 1995

Strategic management